Carlo Pellegrini (25 October 1866 – 5 September 1937) was an Italian painter. He won a gold medal at the 1912 Summer Olympics in the mixed painting section of the art competitions.

References

Further reading
 Allgemeines Künstlerlexikon: Bio-bibliographischer Index A-Z. München u. Leipzig: K.G. Saur, 2000, vol. 7, p. 643 
 Giulio Bolaffi (ed.). Dizionario enciclopedico Bolaffi dei pittori e degli incisori italiani. Dall'XI al XX secolo. Turin: Giulio Bolaffi Editore, vol. VII, 1975
 A.M. Comanducci. Dizionario illustrato dei pittori, disegnatori e incisori italiani moderni e contemporanei. Milan: Luigi Patuzzi Editore, 4th edn., vol. IV (Mont-Ron), 1973, p. 2394 (also in the 1st, 2nd and 3rd editions)
 Willy Rotzler, Fritz Schärer, Karl Worbmann et al. Das Plakat in der Schweiz. Schaffhausen: Edition Stemmle, 1990, p. 239
 Giorgio Taroni. Carlo Pellegrini. Pittore e illustratore. Taroni, Collana Pittori lombardi del XIX e XX secolo, 2005, 240 pages , 
 

1866 births
1937 deaths
19th-century Italian painters
Italian male painters
20th-century Italian painters
Olympic gold medalists in art competitions
Olympic gold medalists for Italy
Medalists at the 1912 Summer Olympics
19th-century Italian male artists
Olympic competitors in art competitions
20th-century Italian male artists